Biological clock may refer to:
 Age and female fertility, decrease of female fertility with advancing maternal age 
 Ageing, biological program that limits the lifespan of an individual
 Biological rhythms
 Internal clock, the timeframe sensed by the individual's body which is largely affected by the light-dark cycle
 Circadian clock, a molecular mechanism that results in a circadian rhythm in a living organism
 Circadian rhythm, biological process that displays an oscillation about 24 hours, such as the human sleep-wake cycle (the "body clock")
 Epigenetic clock, a set of DNA sites whose methylation levels can be used to measure aging throughout the body
 Molecular clock, a technique that uses the mutation rate of a biomolecule to deduce the time in prehistory when two life forms diverged
 Vernalisation, the induction of flowering by prolonged exposure to low temperatures, as during the winter in a temperate climate
 Menstrual cycle, the regular natural change that occurs in the female reproductive system that makes pregnancy possible